Pudding is a dessert or a savory dish. 

Pudding may also refer to:

Food
 Dessert generally, a usage seen in the United Kingdom and some other Commonwealth countries

Dessert puddings
 Banana pudding
 Bread pudding
 Bread and butter pudding
 Butterscotch, pudding
 Cabinet pudding
 Chocolate pudding
 Christmas pudding
Plum pudding
 Clootie dumpling
 Cottage pudding
 Figgy duff (pudding)
 Figgy pudding
 Fruit pudding
 Hasty pudding
 Indian pudding
 Instant pudding
 Jell-O Pudding, a dessert
 Lemon delicious pudding
 Mango pudding
 Persimmon pudding
 Pistachio pudding
 Pudding Pops, frosty ice pop treats originally made and marketed by Jell-O
 Rice pudding
 Sago pudding
 Sticky toffee pudding
 Summer pudding
 Sussex pond pudding
 Sweet potato, pudding
 Tapioca pudding
 Treacle sponge pudding
 Vanilla pudding, flavored blancmange

Savory puddings
 Black pudding
 Cheese pudding
 Corn pudding
 Groaty pudding
 Liver pudding (liver mush)
 Moin moin, a Nigerian steamed bean pudding
 Pease pudding
 Red pudding
 Steak and kidney pudding
 Tavuk göğsü, a Turkish milk pudding made with shredded chicken
 White pudding
 Yorkshire pudding

Other puddings
 List of puddings, sweet and savory
 Semolina pudding, or semolina porridge, a porridge-type pudding

Places
 Pudding Butte, Oates Land, Antarctica
 Pudding Lane, a street in London
 Pudding Mill Lane DLR station
 Pudding River, Oregon, a tributary of the Molalla River

Other uses
 Pudding, a recurring character from the Space Channel 5 video game series
 Pudding cloth,  a reusable culinary utensil, similar to a cheesecloth or muslin, used for boiling a wide range of puddings
 Pudding Shop, the nickname for the Lale Restaurant in Sultanahmet, Istanbul, Turkey
 Plum pudding model, one of several scientific models of the atom
 "The proof of the pudding, is in the eating", a proverb widely attributed to the Spanish author Miguel de Cervantes in his novel The Ingenious Gentleman Don Quixote

See also
 Pudd'nhead Wilson
 Puddingstone (rock)
 Puddingstone Reservoir
 Puddingwife wrasse